Kleymenovsky is a rural locality (a khutor) in Deminskoye Rural Settlement, Novoanninsky District, Volgograd Oblast, Russia. The population was 123 as of 2010.

Geography 
Kleymenovsky is located in forest steppe on the Khopyorsko-Buzulukskaya Plain, on the Panika River, 31 km west of Novoanninsky (the district's administrative centre) by road. Yaryzhensky is the nearest rural locality.

References 

Rural localities in Novoanninsky District